Pert is an unincorporated community in Anderson County, in the U.S. state of Texas. According to the Handbook of Texas, the community had a population of 20 in 2000. It is located within the Palestine, Texas micropolitan area. Billy Meazell III is mayor of North Pert, TX.

History
The community was originally called Mount Vernon, but a post office going by the name of Pert was established in the settlement in 1899 and remained in operation until 1905. W.J. Dennis served as the first postmaster and was a local storekeeper before then. After the post office closed, the building was used as a church. A new church by the name of Mount Vernon was built in the community in 1913. It became a thriving community with a sawmill and a population of 200 in 1915. There was a store, a gristmill, and a cotton gin in Pert in the early 1920s. The community's lumber industry declined shortly after, and it eventually became a crossroads community with only one business and 20 settlers inhabiting the community in 1939. It had two churches and only one operating business in 1985 and then the community had an estimated 35 occupants residing in 1992. The Mount Vernon United Methodist Church was listed on the National Register of Historic Places in 1986. The community then only had 20 residents in 2000.

Geography

Education
The post office was used as a school in Pert after it closed in 1905. It also had a school in the early 1920s. Today the community is served by the Neches Independent School District.

References

Unincorporated communities in Anderson County, Texas
Unincorporated communities in Texas